The 1992 Five Nations Championship was the 63rd series of the Five Nations Championship, an annual rugby union competition between the major Northern Hemisphere rugby union national teams. The tournament consisted of ten matches held between 18 January and 21 March 1992.

The tournament was the 63rd in its then format as the Five Nations. Including the competition's former incarnation as the Home Nations Championship, the 1991 Five Nations Championship was the 98th Northern Hemisphere rugby union championship.

The championship was contested by England, France, Ireland, Scotland and Wales. England won the tournament, achieving the Grand Slam for the second tournament in a row, their tenth overall in the Five Nations. This was also their 20th outright victory, including five victories in the Home Nations, excluding ten titles shared with other countries. England also won the Triple Crown and Calcutta Cup as a result of their victories over the other Home Nations, in the process setting a new record for most tries scored in the Championship (15) while conceding only four. France, Scotland and Wales placed second, third and fourth respectively with two wins each, while Ireland came last with no victories.

Participants

Squads

Table

Results

External links
1992 Five Nations Championship at ESPN

Five Nations
Six Nations Championship seasons
Five Nations
Five Nations
Five Nations
Five Nations
Five Nations
 
Five Nations
Five Nations
Five Nations